, ring name , is a Japanese retired mixed martial artist. A professional competitor from 1993 until 2013 (and then once again in 2018), he competed for the UFC, PRIDE Fighting Championships, Pancrase, RINGS, K-1 HERO'S, and World Victory Road. He is the former King of Pancrase Heavyweight Champion.

Background
Takahashi excelled in Wrestling, becoming a high school state champion in Japan, and also trained in Karate. he graduated from Yachiyo Shoin High School and Nihon University. he started in Pro Wrestling Fujiwara Gumi in 1992 but joined Pancrase the following year.

Pancrase
Takahashi debuted in mixed martial arts in Pancrase against legally blind yet decorated Wrestler George Weingeroff. The Japanese capitalized on his opponent's inability to see his strikes, and knocked him out with a roundhouse kick. However, it was in his second professional fight in which he gained popularity, becoming known for his incredible toughness and desire to win. Fighting Ken Shamrock, Takahashi suffered a broken jaw from a palm strike and knee and ankle damage from a heel hook, but refused to give up. Takahashi was limping badly for the rest of the bout but continued to fight. Eventually, he got caught in a very tight heel hook and could not escape and was forced to tap. Takahashi had to be carried out of the ring after the fight.

In another memorable showing of heart, Takahashi got caught in a heel hook against Bas Rutten which inevitably broke his shin bone in half. Unwilling to stop the match, Takahashi stood up and continued to fight until, upon kicking Rutten with his broken leg, his shin bone completely snapped in half. His shin didn't bend thanks to the kneeboot he was wearing, but the injury was too much and he finally accepted the match was stopped. It would be a year and a half until Takahashi fought again.

Ultimate Fighting Championship
In 1997, Takahashi had his debut for Ultimate Fighting Championship at the UFC 12 event, where he was pitted against Jiu-Jitsu specialist Wallid Ismail. The fight would become infamous for its irregularities and disregard for the rules, as Takahashi seemed to be uninformed of the event's ruleset while Ismail intentionally ignored it. 

Wallid tried to take Kazuo down several times, only for the Japanese to keep balance every time by illegally grabbing the fence despite the referee's continuous warnings. Minutes into the match, Yoshiki knocked down Wallid with a right hook that seemed to end the fight, but the Japanese fighter stood waiting instead of following up, believing his opponent would receive a 10 count like in Pancrase. Takahashi was better informed about the rule allowing low blows, however, and he demonstrated it by shockingly sliding his hand on Ismail's trunks, tearing away his protective cup and hitting multiple knee strikes to the groin. After some more strike exchanges, the Japanese took the Brazilian down and landed headbutts and hammerfists through his guard until the end of the round. As there was no finish, they went into extra round.

New miscommunications would arise at the overtime when Ismail eye-gouged Kazuo, as the Japanese fighter asked for time to check it out, which was refused due to referee Big John McCarthy not noticing the foul. Takahashi also kicked Ismail on the ground, an illegal attack under the UFC ruleset due to his Wrestling shoes. Once cleared up from the confusion, Takahashi dominated the rest of the overtime with effective punches to take the unanimous decision win. He advanced round, but had to pull out due to a hand injury, being replaced by alternate Nick Sanzo.

Championships and Accomplishments
Pancrase Hybrid Wrestling
Pancrase Heavyweight Championship (One time; first)
One successful title defense
2000 Pancrase Heavyweight Championship Tournament Winner
Ultimate Fighting Championship
UFC 12 Lightweight Tournament Finalist

Mixed martial arts record

|-
| Loss
| align=center| 30-28-3 (1)
| Duško Todorović
| TKO (punches)
| RINGS The Outsider 51: 10th Anniversary Road to Las Vegas
| 
| align=center| 1
| align=center| 1:41
| Kawasaki,_Kanagawa, Japan
| 
|-
| Loss
| align=center| 30-27-3 (1)
| Ryo Kawamura
| TKO (punches)
| Pancrase 252: 20th Anniversary
| 
| align=center| 1
| align=center| 1:43
| Yokohama, Kanagawa, Japan
| 
|-
| Win
| align=center| 30-26-3 (1)
| Kenichi Yamamoto
| KO (knee)
| U-Spirits: U-Spirits Again
| 
| align=center| 1
| align=center| 6:29
| Tokyo, Japan
| 
|-
| Loss
| align=center| 29-26-3 (1)
| Yuji Sakuragi
| KO (punch)
| Pancrase: Progress Tour 9
| 
| align=center| 1
| align=center| 4:59
| Tokyo, Japan
| 
|-
| Win
| align=center| 29-25-3 (1)
| Chang Seob Lee
| Submission (scarf hold armlock)
| World Victory Road Presents: Sengoku Raiden Championships 15
| 
| align=center| 1
| align=center| 2:28
| Tokyo, Japan
| 
|-
| Loss
| align=center| 28-25-3 (1)
| Antony Rea
| TKO (punches)
| Fury 1: Clash of the Titans
| 
| align=center| 1
| align=center| N/A
| Cotai, Macau
| 
|-
| Loss
| align=center| 28-24-3 (1)
| Valentijn Overeem
| KO (flying knee)
| World Victory Road Presents: Sengoku 4
| 
| align=center| 1
| align=center| 2:42
| Saitama, Japan
| 
|-
| Loss
| align=center| 28-23-3 (1)
| Fábio Silva
| KO (knee)
| World Victory Road Presents: Sengoku 3
| 
| align=center| 2
| align=center| 0:25
| Saitama, Japan
| 
|-
| Loss
| align=center| 28-22-3 (1)
| Mark Burch
| KO (knee)
| BodogFIGHT: Alvarez vs Lee
| 
| align=center| 1
| align=center| 3:45
| Trenton, New Jersey, United States
| 
|-
| Loss
| align=center| 28-21-3 (1)
| Melvin Manhoef
| TKO (punches)
| HERO'S 8
| 
| align=center| 1
| align=center| 2:36
| Nagoya, Japan
| 
|-
| NC
| align=center| 28-20-3 (1)
| Mark Burch
| No Contest (Accidental Eye Gouge)
| BodogFIGHT: Costa Rica
| 
| align=center| 1
| align=center| 1:05
| Costa Rica
| 
|-
| Loss
| align=center| 28-20-3
| Vitor Belfort
| KO (punch)
| PRIDE FC: Critical Countdown Absolute
| 
| align=center| 1
| align=center| 0:36
| Saitama, Japan
| 
|-
| Win
| align=center| 28-19-3
| Kestutis Arbocius
| Decision (majority)
| Pancrase: Spiral 8
| 
| align=center| 3
| align=center| 5:00
| Yokohama, Japan
| 
|-
| Win
| align=center| 27-19-3
| Yuji Sakuragi
| Submission (armlock)
| Pancrase: Spiral 5
| 
| align=center| 2
| align=center| 3:01
| Yokohama, Japan
| 
|-
| Loss
| align=center| 26-19-3
| Igor Vovchanchyn
| KO (punch)
| PRIDE 29: Fists of Fire
| 
| align=center| 1
| align=center| 1:10
| Saitama, Japan
| 
|-
| Loss
| align=center| 26-18-3
| Heath Herring
| TKO (punches)
| PRIDE Total Elimination 2004
| 
| align=center| 1
| align=center| 4:53
| Saitama, Japan
| 2004 PRIDE Heavyweight Grand Prix First Round
|-
| Loss
| align=center| 26-17-3
| Josh Barnett
| Submission (triangle/armbar)
| NJPW Ultimate Crush II
| 
| align=center| 2
| align=center| 
| Tokyo, Japan
| For the Pancrase Openweight Championship.
|-
| Win
| align=center| 26-16-3
| Tsuyoshi Ozawa
| TKO (doctor stoppage)
| Pancrase: 2003 Neo-Blood Tournament Opening Round
| 
| align=center| 1
| align=center| 5:00
| Tokyo, Japan
| Defended the King of Pancrase Heavyweight Championship.
|-
| Win
| align=center| 25-15-3
| Hideki Tadao
| Decision (majority)
| Pancrase: Spirit 6
| 
| align=center| 3
| align=center| 5:00
| Umeda Stella Hall
| 
|-
| Win
| align=center| 24-15-3
| Katsuhisa Fujii
| TKO (punches)
| Pancrase: Proof 7
| 
| align=center| 1
| align=center| 1:12
| Yokohama, Japan
| Won the inaugural Pancrase Heavyweight Championship.
|-
| Win
| align=center| 23-15-3
| Marcelo Tigre
| DQ (eye gouging)
| Pancrase: 2001 Anniversary Show
| 
| align=center| 1
| align=center| 3:20
| Kanagawa, Japan
| 
|-
| Win
| align=center| 22-15-3
| Hiroya Takada
| Submission (guillotine choke)
| Pancrase: 2001 Anniversary Show
| 
| align=center| 2
| align=center| 0:22
| Kanagawa, Japan
| 
|-
| Win
| align=center| 21-15-3
| Katsuomi Inagaki
| Technical Submission (arm triangle choke)
| Pancrase: Proof 5
| 
| align=center| 1
| align=center| 1:38
| Osaka, Japan
| 
|-
| Win
| align=center| 20-15-3
| David Frendin
| TKO (punches)
| Pancrase: Proof 4
| 
| align=center| 1
| align=center| 0:26
| Tokyo, Japan
| 
|-
| Win
| align=center| 19-15-3
| Mitsuyoshi Sato
| Decision (unanimous)
| Pancrase: Proof 1
| 
| align=center| 3
| align=center| 5:00
| Tokyo, Japan
| 
|-
| Loss
| align=center| 18-15-3
| Sanae Kikuta
| Submission (arm triangle choke)
| Pancrase: Trans 7
| 
| align=center| 1
| align=center| 7:22
| Tokyo, Japan
| 
|-
| Win
| align=center| 18-14-3
| Masutatsu Yano
| Decision (unanimous)
| Pancrase: 2000 Neo-Blood Tournament Second Round
| 
| align=center| 1
| align=center| 10:00
| Osaka, Japan
| 
|-
| Loss
| align=center| 17-14-3
| Semmy Schilt
| TKO (strikes)
| Pancrase: Trans 3
| 
| align=center| 1
| align=center| 7:30
| Yokohama, Japan
| For King of Pancrase Openweight Championship.
|-
| Win
| align=center| 17-13-3
| John Cronk
| Submission (elbows and headbutts)
| Pancrase: Breakthrough 11
| 
| align=center| 1
| align=center| 7:59
| Yokohama, Japan
| 
|-
| Win
| align=center| 16-13-3
| Osami Shibuya
| Submission (guillotine choke)
| Pancrase: 1999 Anniversary Show
| 
| align=center| 1
| align=center| 6:08
| Tokyo, Japan
| 
|-
| Draw
| align=center| 15-13-3
| John Lober
| Draw
| Pancrase: Breakthrough 6
| 
| align=center| 2
| align=center| 3:00
| Tokyo, Japan
| 
|-
| Win
| align=center| 15-13-2
| Omar Bouiche
| Submission (armbar)
| Pancrase: Breakthrough 4
| 
| align=center| 1
| align=center| 8:47
| Yokohama, Japan
| 
|-
| Win
| align=center| 14-13-2
| Minoru Suzuki
| TKO (lost points)
| Pancrase: 1998 Anniversary Show
| 
| align=center| 1
| align=center| 8:06
| Japan
| 
|-
| Draw
| align=center| 13-13-2
| Katsuomi Inagaki
| Draw
| Pancrase: Advance 8
| 
| align=center| 2
| align=center| 3:00
| Kobe, Japan
| 
|-
| Loss
| align=center| 13-13-1
| Semmy Schilt
| TKO
| Pancrase: Advance 6
| 
| align=center| 1
| align=center| 5:44
| Tokyo, Japan
| 
|-
| Win
| align=center| 13-12-1
| Leon Dijk
| Decision (unanimous)
| Pancrase: Advance 4
| 
| align=center| 2
| align=center| 3:00
| Tokyo, Japan
| 
|-
| Loss
| align=center| 12-12-1
| Osami Shibuya
| Submission
| Pancrase: Advance 2
| 
| align=center| 1
| align=center| 9:35
| Yokohama, Japan
| 
|-
| Loss
| align=center| 12-11-1
| Yuki Kondo
| Submission (arm triangle choke)
| Pancrase: Alive 10
| 
| align=center| 1
| align=center| 7:27
| Kobe, Japan
| 
|-
| Win
| align=center| 12-10-1
| Kim Jong Wang
| KO (knees)
| Pancrase: Alive 9
| 
| align=center| 1
| align=center| 1:06
| Tokyo, Japan
| 
|-
| Loss
| align=center| 11-10-1
| Jason Godsey
| Submission (rear naked choke)
| Pancrase: 1997 Anniversary Show
| 
| align=center| 2
| align=center| 1:20
| Tokyo, Japan
| 
|-
| Loss
| align=center| 11-9-1
| Jason DeLucia
| Submission (armbar)
| Pancrase: Alive 5
| 
| align=center| 1
| align=center| 5:13
| Kobe, Japan
| 
|-
| Win
| align=center| 11-8-1
| Satoshi Hasegawa
| TKO
| Pancrase: Alive 4
| 
| align=center| 1
| align=center| 6:20
| Tokyo, Japan
| 
|-
| Loss
| align=center| 10-8-1
| Semmy Schilt
| TKO
| Pancrase: Alive 3
| 
| align=center| 1
| align=center| 7:00
| Nagoya, Japan
| 
|-
| Win
| align=center| 10-7-1
| Wallid Ismail
| Decision
| UFC 12
| 
| align=center| 1
| align=center| 15:00
| Alabama, United States
| UFC 12 Lightweight Tournament Semifinal; pulled out of the final due to injury.
|-
| Win
| align=center| 9-7-1
| Keiichiro Yamamiya
| Submission
| Pancrase: Truth 9
| 
| align=center| 1
| align=center| 7:12
| Kobe, Japan
| 
|-
| Loss
| align=center| 8-7-1
| Vernon White
| KO (kick)
| Pancrase: 1996 Anniversary Show
| 
| align=center| 1
| align=center| 19:43
| Tokyo, Japan
| 
|-
| Win
| align=center| 8-6-1
| Ryushi Yanagisawa
| Decision (lost points)
| Pancrase: 1996 Neo-Blood Tournament, Round 1
| 
| align=center| 1
| align=center| 15:00
| Tokyo, Japan
| 
|-
| Draw
| align=center| 7-6-1
| Manabu Yamada
| Draw
| Pancrase: Truth 6
| 
| align=center| 1
| align=center| 10:00
| Fukuoka, Japan
| 
|-
| Win
| align=center| 7-6
| Takafumi Ito
| Decision (unanimous)
| Pancrase: Truth 5
| 
| align=center| 1
| align=center| 10:00
| Tokyo, Japan
| 
|-
| Loss
| align=center| 6-6
| Vernon White
| Decision (lost points)
| Pancrase: Truth 3
| 
| align=center| 1
| align=center| 10:00
| Tokyo, Japan
| 
|-
| Loss
| align=center| 6-5
| Jason DeLucia
| KO
| Pancrase: Truth 2
| 
| align=center| 1
| align=center| 3:37
| Kobe, Japan
| 
|-
| Loss
| align=center| 6-4
| Ken Shamrock
| Decision (lost points)
| Pancrase: Truth 1
| 
| align=center| 1
| align=center| 20:00
| Yokohama, Japan
| 
|-
| Win
| align=center| 6-3
| Scott Bessac
| KO
| Pancrase: Eyes Of Beast 6
| 
| align=center| 1
| align=center| 2:26
| Yokohama, Japan
| 
|-
| Win
| align=center| 5-3
| Osami Shibuya
| Submission
| Pancrase: 1995 Anniversary Show
| 
| align=center| 1
| align=center| 5:12
| Japan
| 
|-
| Loss
| align=center| 4-3
| Bas Rutten
| TKO
| Pancrase: Road To The Championship 1
| 
| align=center| 1
| align=center| 1:37
| Tokyo, Japan
| 
|-
| Win
| align=center| 4-2
| Andre Van Den Oetelaar
| Decision (lost points)
| Pancrase: Pancrash! 3
| 
| align=center| 1
| align=center| 30:00
| Osaka, Japan
| 
|-
| Win
| align=center| 3-2
| Katsuomi Inagaki
| Submission (rear naked choke)
| Pancrase: Pancrash! 1
| 
| align=center| 1
| align=center| 5:41
| Yokohama, Japan
| 
|-
| Loss
| align=center| 2-2
| Masakatsu Funaki
| TKO
| Pancrase: Yes, We Are Hybrid Wrestlers 4
| 
| align=center| 1
| align=center| 3:09
| Japan
| 
|-
| Win
| align=center| 2-1
| James Mathews
| Submission
| Pancrase: Yes, We Are Hybrid Wrestlers 3
| 
| align=center| 1
| align=center| 1:11
| Kobe World Commemoration Hall
| 
|-
| Loss
| align=center| 1-1
| Ken Shamrock
| Submission (heel hook)
| Pancrase: Yes, We Are Hybrid Wrestlers 2
| 
| align=center| 1
| align=center| 12:23
| Nagoya, Japan
| 
|-
| Win
| align=center| 1-0
| George Weingeroff
| KO (high kick)
| Pancrase: Yes, We Are Hybrid Wrestlers 1
| 
| align=center| 1
| align=center| 1:23
| Tokyo, Japan
|

Mixed rules

| Win
|align=center| 1–0
| Superman Sattasaba
| Submission (scarf hold)
| PWFG Stack of Arms
| 
|align=center| 1
|align=center| 2:37
| Tokyo, Japan
| 
|-

References

External links
 
 

1969 births
Living people
Japanese male mixed martial artists
Light heavyweight mixed martial artists
Heavyweight mixed martial artists
Mixed martial artists utilizing catch wrestling
Mixed martial artists utilizing freestyle wrestling
Mixed martial artists utilizing karate
Japanese male professional wrestlers
Japanese male sport wrestlers
Japanese catch wrestlers
Japanese male karateka
People from Ichikawa, Chiba
Nihon University alumni
Ultimate Fighting Championship male fighters